Arijit Bagui  (born 29 August 1993), is an Indian professional footballer who plays as a defender for Sreenidi Deccan in the I-League.

Career
Arijit started his football career with Kalighat MS. He played for the club in 2013–14 Calcutta Premier Division. On 9 September 2013, he scored a goal against East Bengal in the 57 minute of their opening encounter of the 2013–14 season.

He played for them in 2014 I-League 2nd Division.

In 2016, he joined Peerless SC and played for them in the 2016–17 Calcutta Premier Division. He used to play as a winger, both left and right flank at Kalighat MS and was then converted into a right-back at Peerless.

Mohun Bagan
In July 2017, Mohun Bagan signed him for the 2017–18 Calcutta Premier Division and 2017–18 I-League. He won the Sikkim Governor's Gold Cup in October 2017 with the club.

2017–2018 season
Sarthak Golui who was to be the first-choice right-back was loaned out to FC Pune City and suddenly Bagui was competing for a spot in the playing eleven with Gurjinder Kumar at the start of the I-League in November 2017.

It was no surprise that Sanjoy Sen decided to go with the more experienced of the two for the first game of the season. Kumar was at fault for the late equaliser Minerva Punjab  scored to draw the match 1-1 and was dropped. In came Arijit Bagui in the lineup for the next game – the Kolkata derby against East Bengal. A 1–0 win followed and Sen seemed to have found his replacement for Pritam Kotal, who left for Delhi Dynamos.

He was stretchered off in the next game itself where he injured his ankle after a tackle by a Churchill Brothers player in an off-the-ball incident. During that three-week layoff, Mohun Bagan experienced one of their most tumultuous periods in recent history. Sen resigned following three draws and after suffering his first league home defeat in three years with the club were languishing in the sixth spot.

The Dankuni resident made his comeback coincidentally on the day Sankarlal Chakraborty took full-time charge - in a 2-0 win over Aizawl FC. After winning 21 points from 11 matches thereafter, Chakraborty kept Bagan in the title race till the last day of the league. They turned around the season to finish third, four points behind champions Minerva Punjab and Bagui played in each of the final eleven games.

2018–19 season
He won the 2018–19 Calcutta Premier Division with the club. He made a total of 16 appearances for the club in the 2018–19 I-League.

2019–20 season
On 25 May 2019 Mohun Bagan retained him along with seven other players for the 2019–20 season. On 22 July 2019 it was announced that The Best Footballer award for last season was conferred to Arijit Bagui for his excellent performance as a right back.

Career statistics

Club

Honours

Club

Mohun Bagan
Calcutta Football League: 2018–19

References

Indian footballers
Living people
1993 births
Footballers from West Bengal
Association football defenders
I-League players
Mohun Bagan AC players
Calcutta Football League players
I-League 2nd Division players
Bhawanipore FC players
Mohammedan SC (Kolkata) players
Sreenidi Deccan FC players
Peerless SC players